Anastasia Yuryevna Logunova (born 20 July 1990) is a Russian basketball player. She qualified for the 2020 Summer Olympics, playing in a team with Mariia Cherepanova, Olga Frolkina, and Yulia Kozik in the 3×3 tournament. With Dynamo Kursk she won the 2017 EuroLeague. She has also played for the Russia women's national 3x3 team, who notably won the inaugural 2014 FIBA Europe 3x3 Championships.

References

External links
 Anastasia Logunova at FIBA
 
 
 
 

1990 births
Living people
3x3 basketball players at the 2020 Summer Olympics
Basketball players from Moscow
Medalists at the 2013 Summer Universiade
Medalists at the 2020 Summer Olympics
Olympic 3x3 basketball players of Russia
Olympic medalists in 3x3 basketball
Russian women's 3x3 basketball players
Russian women's basketball players
Universiade medalists in basketball
Universiade silver medalists for Russia
Olympic silver medalists for the Russian Olympic Committee athletes